The Netherlands Football League Championship 1950–1951 was contested by 60 teams participating in five divisions. The national champion would be determined by a play-off featuring the winners of each division of the Netherlands. PSV Eindhoven won this year's championship by beating DWS, Willem II, Blauw-Wit Amsterdam and sc Heerenveen.

At the end of this season, the KNVB re-aligned the current system of Divisions into 4 new Divisions for 1951–52, to be called Eerste Klasse A-D.

New entrants
This season, there was one division less than in the last one; this meant that all teams had to be reassigned.

Eerste Klasse A:
Moving in from Division East: Go Ahead and Zwolsche Boys
Moving in from Division North: Achilles 1894, Be Quick 1887, LAC Frisia 1883, GVAV Rapiditas, sc Heerenveen, HSC VV Leeuwarden, Sneek Wit Zwart and Velocitas 1897
Promoted from 2nd Division: VV Zwartemeer
Eerste Klasse B:
Moving in from Division East: AGOVV Apeldoorn, Enschedese Boys, Heracles, HVV Hengelo, NEC Nijmegen, SC Enschede and FC Wageningen
Moving in from Division West-I: DOS
Moving in from Division West-II: AFC Ajax, DWS and HVV 't Gooi
Promoted from 2nd Division: Vitesse Arnhem
Eerste Klasse C:
Moving in from Division West-I: ADO Den Haag, Blauw-Wit Amsterdam, HFC Haarlem, Hermes DVS, KFC and VSV
Moving in from Division West-II: HFC EDO, HBS Craeyenhout, RCH, SVV and De Volewijckers
Promoted from 2nd Division: DWV
Eerste Klasse D:
Moving in from Division South-I: NOAD and RBC Roosendaal
Moving in from Division South-II: BVV Den Bosch, NOAD,  NAC, TSC and Willem II
Moving in from West-I: Feijenoord, Sparta Rotterdam
Moving in from West-II: Xerxes
Promoted form 2nd Division: De Baronie & Emma
Eerste Klasse E:
Moving in from Division South-I: Brabantia, SC Helmondia, MVV Maastricht, PSV Eindhoven, SV Limburgia and VVV Venlo
Moving in from Division South-II: Bleijerheide, FC Eindhoven, SC Emma and Maurits
Promoted from 2nd Division: VV Chèvremont & Sittardia

Divisions

Eerste Klasse A

Eerste Klasse B

Eerste Klasse C

Eerste Klasse D

Eerste Klasse E

Championship play-off

References
RSSSF Netherlands Football League Championships 1898-1954

Netherlands Football League Championship seasons
1950–51 in Dutch football
Neth